The Turkish Journal of Chemistry is a bimonthly peer-reviewed open access scientific journal covering research in chemistry. It was established in 1977 and is published by the Scientific and Technological Research Council of Turkey (TÜBITAK). The editor-in-chief is Ahmet Gül (Istanbul Technical University).

Abstracting and indexing
The journal is abstracted and indexed in:

According to the Journal Citation Reports, the journal has a 2019 impact factor of 0.981.

References

External links

Scientific and Technological Research Council of Turkey
Bimonthly journals
Creative Commons Attribution-licensed journals
English-language journals
Publications established in 1977
1977 establishments in Turkey